Leonard Mulenga (born 26 November 1997) is a Zambian footballer who plays as a defensive midfielder for Green Buffaloes and the Zambia national football team.

References

External links

1997 births
Living people
Zambian footballers
Sportspeople from Lusaka
Association football midfielders
Green Buffaloes F.C. players
Zambia Super League players
Zambia international footballers
Zambia A' international footballers
2020 African Nations Championship players